Bonny (originally  Ibani) is a traditional, coastal town and a Local Government Area in Rivers State in southern Nigeria, on the Bight of Bonny.  It is also the capital of the Kingdom of Bonny. Traditionally (especially between the 15th and 19th centuries) it was a major trading post of the eastern Delta, especially active in the sale of enslaved people. Bonny Island is a major export point for oil today.

The region produces a type of crude oil known as Bonny Light oil. Much of the oil extracted onshore in Rivers State is piped to Bonny for export. It has the biggest LNG Gas Plant in Nigeria with six (6) trains. Currently, the Federal Government of Nigeria has set plans for the construction of the 7th train of the NLNG to boost its gas production in anticipation of dominating the African market.

Bonny has a bridge being constructed from Bodo in Gokana LGA to enable land transportation. A deep seaport is underway as a Corporate social responsibility project from CCECC.

Kingdom of Bonny

The Kingdom of Bonny was a sovereign state in the Niger Delta. It is currently one of Nigeria's traditional states.

The kingdom, comprising virgin lands and territorial areas, was founded before or about AD 1000 by Ndoli and his brothers. From these leaders and the entire founding generation of the kingdom evolved the lineage/ward/house system of governance that is currently used to administer the state. The Amanyanabo, or monarch (lit. "owner of the land"), presides over a chieftaincy system composed of the Ase-Alapu (or "high chiefs of royal blood") and the Amadapu (or "district heads").

The Kingdom of Bonny was powerful beginning in the 15th century with the advent of the Portuguese and the following Atlantic slave trade. In the 19th century, it came under increasing pressure from the British to end the trade. It collapsed in the subsequent Bonny civil war of 1869. A remnant of it continues to exist, however, as a part of the contemporary aristocratic structure of Nigeria.

See also
 Bonnie

References

External links

 Bonny at Encyclopædia Britannica
 Bonny at Encyclopedia.com
 King Jaja of Opobo at Black History Pages

Oil fields of Nigeria
Towns in Rivers State
Local Government Areas in Rivers State
Populated coastal places in Rivers State